Sir Francis Anderson (3 September 1858 – 24 June 1941) was a Scottish-born Australian philosopher and educator.

Early life
Francis Anderson was born in Glasgow, the son of Francis Anderson, a manufacturer, and his wife Elizabeth Anna Lockart, née Ellison. Anderson was educated at Old Wynd and Oatlands public schools and became a pupil-teacher at the age of 14. He went on to the University of Glasgow, matriculating in 1876 and graduated M.A. in 1883. He was awarded Sir Richard Jebb's prize for Greek literature, took first place in the philosophical classes of Professors Veitch and Caird, and won two scholarships. For two years he was assistant to the professor of moral philosophy, studied in the theological faculty with the intention of entering the ministry, but apparently was not ordained.

To Australia
Anderson came to Melbourne in 1886 as assistant to the Rev. Dr Charles Strong at his Australian Church. This was a valuable experience to Anderson as his work brought him in contact with both the best and the worst types of human nature. In 1888, instead of returning to Scotland as originally intended, he was appointed lecturer in logic and mental philosophy at the University of Sydney, and was the first Challis professor of those subjects from the beginning of 1890. He held this position until the end of 1921, when he retired and became emeritus professor.

Anderson was president of the mental science and education section at the meeting of the Australasian Association for the Advancement of Science held at Brisbane in January 1895 and gave an address on "Politics and Education" and, on 26 June 1901, at a conference of teachers, in an address on "The Public School System of New South Wales", spoke frankly on "the defects, limitations and needs of the existing system of education". Mr J. Perry, the minister of public instruction, immediately called a conference of inspectors and principal officers of his department and' in 1902 J. W. Turner and Sir George Handley Knibbs were appointed as commissioners to inquire into educational systems in Europe and America. Their report confirmed Anderson's strictures, the pupil-teacher system was abolished, and the training of teachers at the Teachers' College was reconstructed. Thirteen years later Anderson was able to report an immense improvement in the state of education in New South Wales (see his chapter on "Educational Policy and Development" in the Federal Handbook prepared for the meeting of the British Association for the Advancement of Science held in Australia in 1914). Anderson was president of the social and statistical science section at the meeting of the Australasian Association for the Advancement of Science held at Adelaide in 1907 and gave an address on "Liberalism and Socialism". This was followed by a paper on "Sociology in Australia. A Plea for its Teaching" given at the Sydney meeting held in 1911. Following the discussion, a resolution was unanimously passed recommending the institution of a chair of sociology in Australia.

Anderson was the inaugural editor of the Australasian Journal of Psychology and Philosophy 1923–1926, and he also took a great deal of interest in the tutorial classes and Workers' Education Association movements. Another interest was the League of Nations.

Honours and legacy

When Anderson retired at the end of 1921, it was proposed to have his portrait painted but instead he suggested that a frieze emblematic of the history of philosophy should be placed in the philosophy lecture room of the university. Eventually two mural panels were painted for it by the artist Norman Carter, one representing Socrates, Plato, and Aristotle, the other Descartes, Bacon, and Spinoza.

Anderson was knighted in the 1936 King's Birthday Honours and died in Sydney on 24 June 1941. for "educational and social welfare services". Some of his papers and addresses were published separately as pamphlets. His monograph on Liberty, Equality and Fraternity was issued by the Association of Psychology and Philosophy.

Personal life
He married twice, firstly to Maybanke Selfe Wolstenholme, and then to Josephine Wight who survived him; there were no children.

References

 The Sydney Morning Herald, 25 June 1941;
 H. T. L., The Australasian Journal of Psychology and Philosophy, August 1941;
 Calendar of the University of Sydney, 1923, p. 782;
 Burke's Peerage etc., 1937;
 S. H. Smith and G. T. Spaull, History of Education in New South Wales.
  J. Franklin, Corrupting the Youth: A History of Philosophy in Australia, (Macleay Press, 2003), ch. 6.
 Francis Anderson papers, Sydney University Archives.

Notes

Additional sources listed by the Dictionary of Australian Biography:
G. V. Portus, Happy Highways (Melb, 1953), and 'Francis Anderson—professor and citizen', Hermes, Nov 1921; Australian Journal of Science, 4 (1941–42); H. T. Lovell, 'In memoriam', Australasian Journal of Psychology and Philosophy, 19 (1941); Sydney Morning Herald, 27 June 1901, 15 November 1921

1858 births
1941 deaths
19th-century essayists
19th-century philosophers
20th-century Australian non-fiction writers
20th-century Australian philosophers
20th-century essayists
Australian educators
Australian essayists
Australian ethicists
Australian Knights Bachelor
Australian logicians
Australian male non-fiction writers
Australian sociologists
Lecturers
Pamphleteers
Philosophers of culture
Philosophers of education
Philosophers of logic
Philosophers of social science
Philosophy academics
Philosophy writers
Political philosophers
Scottish educators
Scottish emigrants to colonial Australia
Scottish essayists
Scottish ethicists
Scottish logicians
Scottish philosophers
Scottish sociologists
Australian social commentators
Social philosophers
Alumni of the University of Glasgow
Academic staff of the University of Sydney
Writers about activism and social change